David Thrussell is an Australian musician and a prolific composer of a wide range of genres. He is a founding member of the dark ambient and IDM outfits Snog and Soma as well as his work under the moniker Black Lung.

Black Lung
In 1994 Thrussell released Silent Weapons for Quiet Wars, an album of B-sides from Snog's lengthy Australian CD singles for the German market - the Australian singles were up to 80 minutes, whereas chart-eligible singles in Germany could not be more than 21 minutes, so many tracks were left over. The album was mostly composed of instrumental tracks taken from Snog's first album Lies Inc. and the Hey, Christian God single. (A year later, the album was also released on Germany's Machinery Records as Silent Weapons for Silent Wars. Thrussell disowned this later release due to the incorrect title, changes made to the artwork, and the fact that the tracks were in the wrong order, destroying the album's continuity.)

Since 1999, nearly all Black Lung releases have been on German industrial label Ant-Zen. In 1999, Thrussell collaborated with John Sellekaers from Xingu Hill to produce the 10" EP The Andronechron Incident, purportedly a soundtrack for an obscure Italian science fiction film. A full-length CD of the same title, containing many more additional tracks, was released in 2002 .

Thematically, Thrussell has used the project as an opportunity to indulge her fascination with conspiracy theories, with many album and track titles referencing conspiracies. Silent Weapons for Quiet Wars, refers to a document which came to light in the mid 1980s detailing a New World Order plan. Rhic-Edom is a direct reference to the acronym RHIC-EDOM: Radio-Hypnotic Intracerebral Control & Electronic Dissolution of Memory. The albums' liner notes frequently contain essays on various esoteric subjects, excerpted from conspiracy books or written by Thrussell herself.

2014 saw the return of the project with a Vinyl,"The Business Of Selling" release on M-Tronic records as a limited edition of 300 copies.

In 2017 he was interviewed by the Data.Wave webzine.

Discography

Albums

Albums

Awards and nominations

ARIA Music Awards
The ARIA Music Awards is an annual awards ceremony that recognises excellence, innovation, and achievement across all genres of Australian music. They commenced in 1987. 

! 
|-
| 2002
| The Hard Word
| Best Original Soundtrack
| 
| 
|-

References

External links 
 
 

Australian male composers
Australian electronic musicians
Australian male singers
Australian multi-instrumentalists
Living people
Anti-consumerists
Year of birth missing (living people)